David Kellogg Cartter (June 22, 1812 – April 16, 1887) was an American lawyer, jurist, and politician who served as a United States representative from Ohio, Minister Resident of the United States to Bolivia and Chief Justice of the Supreme Court of the District of Columbia.

Education and career

Born on June 22, 1812, in Jefferson County, New York, Cartter read law in 1832. He was admitted to the bar and entered private practice in Rochester, New York, from 1832 to 1836, and continued in private practice in Akron, Ohio, from 1836 to 1845, and in Massillon, Ohio, from 1845 to 1849.

Congressional service

Cartter was elected as a Democrat from Ohio's 18th congressional district to the United States House of Representatives of the 31st and 32nd United States Congresses, serving from March 4, 1849, to March 3, 1853. He was Chairman of the Committee on Patents for the 32nd United States Congress.

Later career

Following his departure from Congress, Cartter resumed private practice in Massillon from 1853 to 1856, then in Cleveland, Ohio, from 1856 to 1861. He was a delegate to the 1860 Republican National Convention. He served as Minister Resident of the United States to Bolivia from March 27, 1861, to March 10, 1862.

Federal judicial service

He was confirmed by the United States Senate on March 11, 1863, and received his commission the same day. His service terminated on April 16, 1887, due to his death in Washington, D.C. He was interred in Lake View Cemetery in Cleveland.

References

Sources

 
 
 

1812 births
1887 deaths
19th-century American diplomats
People from Massillon, Ohio
Politicians from Cleveland
United States federal judges appointed by Abraham Lincoln
19th-century American judges
Judges of the United States District Court for the District of Columbia
Burials at Lake View Cemetery, Cleveland
Ohio Republicans
Democratic Party members of the United States House of Representatives from Ohio
Ambassadors of the United States to Bolivia
19th-century American politicians
United States federal judges admitted to the practice of law by reading law